Carol Friedman is a scientist and biomedical informatician. She is among the pioneers the use of expert systems in  medical language processing and the explicit medical concept representation underpinning the use of entity–attribute–value modeling underpinning electronic medical records.

Life
Before her doctoral degree, working under the direction of Naomi Sager at New York University, she also contributed to the development of second generation medical language processing systems. After her doctoral degree in computer science (natural language processing) under Dr. Ralph Grishman at the Courant Institute of Mathematics at New York University, she has developed annotative clinical information systems that have been integrated in the New York–Presbyterian Hospital, and the Columbia University Medical Center.

She is recognized for her development, translation to clinical practice and evaluation of the MedLEE medical language processing system. MedLEE is in daily use for clinical decision support at NewYork–Presbyterian Hospital. She adapted and evaluated the MedLEE system to build biomolecular and genotype-phenotype networks (GENIES and BioMedLEE respectively). MedLEE and GENIES exemplify the translation to practice of the sub-language theory proposed by Zellig Harris that Friedman pursued. In summary, she has been demonstrating the value of natural language processing for a broad range of clinical and biomedical applications that include decision support, automated encoding, vocabulary development, sub-language grammar applied to biomedicine, clinical research, outcomes analysis, error detection, and genomics research.

Friedman is Professor of Biomedical Informatics at Columbia University. Friedman was a member of the Board of Regents of the National Library of Medicine from 2007 to 2011, and has published over 150 articles.

Publications

References

External links
 

Living people
United States National Library of Medicine
Health informaticians
New York University alumni
Columbia University faculty
Columbia Medical School faculty
Year of birth missing (living people)
Place of birth missing (living people)
City College of New York alumni
Members of the National Academy of Medicine
Natural language processing researchers
Data miners